Lightning is a proprietary computer bus and power connector created and designed by Apple Inc. and introduced on , to replace its predecessor, the 30-pin dock connector. The Lightning connector is used to connect Apple mobile devices like iPhones, iPads, and iPods to host computers, external monitors, cameras, USB battery chargers, and other peripherals. Using 8 pins instead of 30, Lightning is much smaller than its predecessor, which was integrated with devices like the iPhone 4 and the iPad 2. The Lightning plug is symmetrical (same pins on either side), so it can be inserted into a Lightning receptacle in either orientation. The plug is indented on each side to match up with corresponding points inside the receptacle to retain the connection.

History
It would soon be integrated with all new hardware and devices that were to be announced at the same event. The first compatible devices were the iPhone 5, the iPod Touch (5th generation), and the iPod Nano (7th generation). The iPad (4th generation) and the iPad Mini (1st generation) were added as Lightning devices in October 2012.

On November 25, 2012, Apple acquired the "Lightning" trademark in Europe from Harley-Davidson. Apple was given a partial transfer of the Lightning trademark, suggesting that Harley-Davidson likely retained the rights to use the name for motorcycle-related products. Apple is the sole proprietor of the trademark and copyrights for the designs and specifications of the Lightning connector.

The iPad Pro, released in 2015, features the first Lightning connector supporting USB 3.0 host. The only accessory that supports USB 3.0 is the new camera adapter. Normal USB-A - Lightning cables are still USB 2.0. On October 30, 2018, Apple announced that their new range of iPad Pro models will replace Lightning with USB-C.

In January 2020, the EU commission proposed laws to standardize charger ports. On October 4, 2022, the EU parliament approved regulations that would require all electronic devices to support USB-C, in order to meet pressure by EU consumers regarding financial costs and e-waste. Commentators said that these regulations will impact Apple most heavily. Apple stated concerns that this will "harm consumers in Europe and around the world," but on October 25, 2022, Greg Joswiak, the vice president of worldwide marketing of Apple, said that Apple will comply with the new EU regulations, indirectly confirming that iPhone models and other devices will ultimately replace Lightning with USB-C in the future.

Technology

Lightning is an 8-pin connector that carries a digital signal. Unlike the Apple 30-pin connector it replaces (and USB Type-A or -B connectors), the Lightning connector can be inserted either face up or face down. Each pin on the reverse side of the connector is connected to its directly opposite twin on the other side. Part of the processor's job is to route the power and data signals correctly whichever way up the connector is inserted.

The maximum transfer speed available over the Lightning connector is 480 Mbit/s, same as USB 2.0.

The Lightning receptacle on the 12.9-inch iPad Pro (1st and 2nd generation) and 10.5-inch iPad Pro models has 16 pins, as there are additional eight pins on the other side. It supports USB 3.0 (now USB 3.2 Gen 1) at the maximum transfer speed of 5 Gbit/s. Only the Lightning to USB 3 camera adapter provides the speed on those iPad Pro models.

Apple offers various adapters that allow the Lightning connector to be used with other interfaces, such as 30-pin, USB, HDMI, VGA, and SD cards. The Lightning to 30-pin adapter supports only a limited subset of the available 30-pin signals: USB data, USB charging, and analog audio output (via the DAC inside of the adapter).

Official Lightning connectors contain an authentication chip that made it difficult for third-party manufacturers to produce compatible accessories without being approved by Apple. The authentication scheme has been cracked, however.

The plug measures 6.7 mm by 1.5 mm.

Comparisons with USB 
Apple has not publicly discussed microUSB, but various tech news websites state that Lightning might have been used instead of microUSB because of its compatibility with docks and speaker systems; the ability to insert the cable in either direction for user convenience; Apple wishing to maintain control over supply chain of accessories; the ability to charge a licensing fee; and the mechanical weakness of USB connectors. The optional supplemental standard USB On-The-Go allows USB devices to do this.

On April 10, 2015, Apple announced a new line of MacBooks that featured USB-C. USB-C has similarities with Lightning, and advantages over microUSB. USB-C, like Lightning, but unlike its predecessor microUSB, can be plugged in either direction. USB-C and Lightning are not interchangeable as they are entirely different pin-outs, protocols and connectors.

Devices using Lightning connectors 
The following first-party and third-party devices use Lightning connectors:

iPhone 

 iPhone 5
 iPhone 5C
 iPhone 5S
 iPhone 6/6 Plus
 iPhone 6S/6S Plus
 iPhone SE (1st generation)
 iPhone 7/7 Plus
 iPhone 8/8 Plus
 iPhone X
 iPhone XS/XS Max
 iPhone XR
 iPhone 11
 iPhone 11 Pro/11 Pro Max
 iPhone SE (2nd generation)
 iPhone 12/12 Mini
 iPhone 12 Pro/12 Pro Max
 iPhone 13/13 Mini
 iPhone 13 Pro/13 Pro Max
 iPhone SE (3rd generation)
 iPhone 14/14 Plus
 iPhone 14 Pro/14 Pro Max

iPad 

 iPad (4th generation)
 iPad (5th generation)
 iPad (6th generation)
 iPad (7th generation)
 iPad (8th generation)
 iPad (9th generation)
 iPad Mini (1st generation)
 iPad Mini 2
 iPad Mini 3
 iPad Mini 4
 iPad Mini (5th generation)
 iPad Air
 iPad Air 2
 iPad Air (3rd generation)
 iPad Pro (1st generation)
 iPad Pro (2nd generation)

iPod 
 iPod Nano (7th generation)
 iPod Touch (5th generation)
 iPod Touch (6th generation)
 iPod Touch (7th generation)

Adapters 

 Lightning to 30-pin Adapter
 Lightning to 30-pin Adapter (0.2 m)
 Lightning to Micro USB Adapter
 Lightning to USB Camera Adapter
 Lightning to USB 3 Camera Adapter
 Lightning to SD Card Camera Reader
 Lightning to VGA Adapter
 Lightning Digital AV Adapter
 Lightning to HDMI
 Lightning to 3.5 mm Headphone Jack Adapter
 Lightning to 3.5 mm Audio Cable
 Lightning to USB (Power Delivery)
 Lightning to USB-C (Power Delivery)

First-party accessories 

 Apple Pencil (1st generation)
 Magic Mouse 2
 Magic Keyboard
 Magic Trackpad 2
 Apple Watch Magnetic Charging Dock
 MagSafe Duo Charger
 MagSafe Battery Pack
 Siri Remote for Apple TV (4th generation)
 Siri Remote for Apple TV 4K (1st & 2nd generation)
 AirPods (1st & 2nd generation) Charging Case and Wireless Charging Case
 AirPods Pro Wireless Charging Case and MagSafe Charging Case
 AirPods (3rd generation) MagSafe Charging Case
 AirPods Max
 EarPods with Lightning Connector
 Powerbeats Pro Charging Case
 Beats Solo Pro headphones
 BeatsX earphones
 Beats Pill+ speaker
 iPhone 5S Dock
 iPhone 5C Dock
 iPhone Lightning Dock

Third-party accessories 

 Belkin Boostcharge Power Bank with Lightning connector
 SteelSeries Nimbus and Nimbus+ gaming controllers
 Backbone One gaming controller
 Razer Inc. Kishi for iPhone gaming controller
 Mophie powerstation with Lightning connector
 Logitech Crayon Apple Pencil alternative

Reception 
Many reviewers have criticized Apple for continuing to include a Lightning port on their products instead of moving to a more modern, universal port such as USB-C. Apple has stated that they continue to use Lightning because replacing it "would create an unprecedented amount of electronic waste". Some reviewers, like senior tech correspondent Lisa Eadicicco, have speculated that it is simply because Apple wants to continue selling its proprietary chargers and accessories.

Problems that affect charging

MFi Certification 
Apple introduced the MFi Program to increase the quality of the third-party accessories and consumer confidence.

Black Middle Pin
A phenomenon exists on lightning connectors where one of the middle gold pins turn black over time, making one side of the connector cease functioning. The pin holds a positive or negative electrical charge, and when the cable is connected to a device, a spark gap can be produced due to extra current being drawn to a capacitor for a short period. This spark gap causes the copper plate of the pin to erode, turning it black.

See also
 Smart Connector

References

Further reading

Apple Inc. hardware
Computer buses
Computer-related introductions in 2012